The Niles Crowites were a short-lived minor league baseball club based in Niles, Ohio for one season, . The team played in the Ohio–Pennsylvania League and posted a 52-37 record, for fourth place in the league's standings. The team folded after the season. There would not be another professional baseball club located in Niles, until the Mahoning Valley Scrappers began play in 1999.

Seasons

Baseball teams established in 1905
Sports clubs disestablished in 1905
Niles, Ohio
Professional baseball teams in Ohio
Defunct minor league baseball teams
1905 establishments in Ohio
1905 disestablishments in Ohio
Defunct baseball teams in Ohio
Ohio-Pennsylvania League teams